Oujé-Bougoumou Cree Nation is a Cree First Nation of Canada. It is headquartered in the Cree village of Oujé-Bougoumou, located on the shores of Opémisca Lake, in the Eeyou Istchee territory equivalent of Quebec. Oujé-Bougoumou is unique from the other First Nations of Eeyou Istchee in that it doesn't have an associated reserve. The village is  due west of Chibougamau.

References

First Nations in Quebec